Christopher John Pugsley  (born 1947) is a New Zealand military historian. He is published as Chris Pugsley and Christopher Pugsley.

Career
Pugsley became interested in writing in 1984 when, as a career officer in the New Zealand Army, he worked on a television documentary about New Zealand's involvement in the Gallipoli campaign and authored Gallipoli: The New Zealand Story, which was shortlisted for the Goodman Fielder Wattie Book Award the same year.

In 1988, he retired from the New Zealand Army to dedicate himself to a new career as an historian.

Academic career
He received his PhD from the University of Waikato in 1992, and in 1994 he became Writing Fellow at the Victoria University of Wellington. He then taught at University of New England, Australia from 1996 to 1999. Until 2014 he was Senior Lecturer in War Studies at the Royal Military Academy Sandhurst and Adjunct Senior Fellow at New Zealand's University of Canterbury.

Areas of interest

During the 1990s he wrote a series of detailed articles called "Walking the Waikato Wars", in the now defunct New Zealand Defence Quarterly, in which he visited each Waikato Battle site and reviewed each battle through the eyes of a modern professional military officer using photographs and maps to illustrate events.

His primary area of interest is 20th-century New Zealand, Australian, Canadian and British Commonwealth military history, with particular focus on Gallipoli, and the Western Front.

Honours
In the 2015 New Year Honours, Pugsley was appointed an Officer of the New Zealand Order of Merit, for services as a military historian. In 2011 the University of Waikato recognised him with a distinguished alumni award.

Publications
 Pugsley, C Le Quesnoy 1918: New Zealand's Last Battle (2018: Oratia Media) 
 Pugsley, C A Bloody Road Home: World War Two and New Zealand's Heroic Second Division (2014: Penguin) 
 Pugsley, C. & Holdsworth, A; Sandhurst: A Tradition of Leadership (2005: Third Millennium) 
 Pugsley, C. Operation Cobra (Battle Zone Normandy) (2004: Sutton) 
 Pugsley, C. From Emergency to Confrontation: The New Zealand Armed Forces in Malaya and Borneo 1949–1966 (2003: OUP Australia and New Zealand) 
 Pugsley, C. The Anzac Experience: New Zealand, Australia and Empire in the First World War (2001: Reed New Zealand) 
 Pugsley, C. Anzac: The New Zealanders at Gallipoli (2000: Reed New Zealand) 
 Pugsley, C. & Moses, J. The German Empire and Britain's Pacific Dominions (2000: Regina) 
 Pugsley, C. The Anzacs at Gallipoli: A Story for Anzac Day (1999: Reed New Zealand) 
 Pugsley, C. Scars on the heart: Two centuries of New Zealand at war (1996: Auckland Museum) 
 Pugsley, C. Te Hokowhitu a Tu: the Maori Pioneer Battalion in the First World War (1995: Reed New Zealand) 
 Pugsley, C. On the Fringe of Hell (1991: Hodder & Stoughton) 
 Pugsley, C. Gallipoli: the New Zealand Story (1984: Hodder & Stoughton)

Notes and references

Further reading
 Pugsley, C. "With the Otago Mounted Rifles on the Western Front, Chapter 9: The Troopers Tale – The History of the Otago Mounted Rifles'' (2012: Turnbull Ross Publishing)

External links
 Victoria University, Writing Fellowship pages
 Pugsley, biography: Royal Military Academy Sandhurst website
 Pugsley, biography: New Zealand Book Council website

Historians of World War I
Historians of World War II
Military historians
20th-century New Zealand historians
Living people
Academics of the Royal Military Academy Sandhurst
1947 births
Officers of the New Zealand Order of Merit
University of Waikato alumni
21st-century New Zealand historians